Venia is a monotypic genus of Kenyan sheet weavers containing the single species, Venia kakamega. It was first described by R. R. Seyfulina & R. Jocqué in 2009, and is only found in Kenya.

See also
 List of Linyphiidae species (Q–Z)

References

Endemic fauna of Kenya
Linyphiidae
Monotypic Araneomorphae genera
Spiders of Africa